The House of Blue Lights is a rhythm and blues album by the soul music artist Don Covay & the Jefferson Lemon Blues Band. It was released in 1969 on Atlantic Records.

Unlike Covay's previous two more Southern soul oriented albums, Covay teamed with former Shirelles guitarist Joe Richardson and folk musician John Hammond in the Jefferson Lemon Blues Band, in an attempt at an underground blues rock.

The album was re-issued on compact disc on September 26, 2002 by Sepia Tone Records.

Track listing
 "Key to the Highway" (Big Bill Broonzy, Charles Segar) – 2:21
 "Mad Dog Blues" (Don Covay, Joe Richardson) – 3:28
 "The Blues Don't Knock" (John Denioa, Sidney Wyche) – 3:11
 "Blues Ain't Nothin' but a Good Woman on Your Mind" (Covay, Richardson) – 3:12
 "The House of Blue Lights, Pt. 1" (Covay) – 7:33
 "Four Women" (Covay) – 3:34
 "Steady Roller" (Covay, John Hammond Jr.) – 3:17
 "Homemade Love" (Covay) – 6:26
 "But I Forgive You Blues" (Hudson Whittaker) – 2:31
 "Shut Your Mouth" (Dave Clowney) – 3:23
 "The House of Blue Lights, Pt. 2" (Covay) – 4:09

Personnel

The band
 Don Covay – vocals
 John Hammond, Jr. - guitar, harmonica
 Jerry Jemmott - bass
 Daniel Jones - drums
 Charles "Honeyman" Otis - drums
 Joe Richardson -  guitar, vocals
 Butch Valentine - bass
 uncredited - Hammond organ

Technical staff
 Don Covay - arranger, producer
 Herb Abramson – engineer
 David Cheppa – mastering

References

External links
 [ The House of Blue Lights] at Allmusic
 The House of Blue Lights at Sepia tone records site

Don Covay albums
1969 albums
Atlantic Records albums